Tritaea or Tritaia or Triteia may refer to:
 Triteia, a figure in Greek mythology
 Tritaia, a village in Greece
 Tritaea (Achaea), a town of ancient Achaea, Greece
 Tritaea (Locris), a town of ancient Locris, Greece
 Tritaea (Phocis), a town of ancient Phocis, Greece
 Achyra (moth), a genus of Moth
 The Sailing Triteia YouTube Channel